Manjal Nila (credited as Manghal Nila) is a 1982 Indian Tamil-language romantic drama film directed by R. Renjith Kumar. It stars Suresh and Kala Ranjani.

Plot 
Anand and Vasantha are new students at a film institute and quickly form a deep connection with each other. Many of the other students and even a few lecturers have an eye for Vasantha and intervene in their budding relationship. Vasantha herself is reluctant to pursue their love beyond friendship as she has a complicated past. Gopi, the editing professor, uses his power to take advantage of female students at the institute. He attempts the same with Vasantha, but is caught and eventually fired by the principal. He nurses a grudge and informs Vasantha's mother about Vasantha's closeness with Anand. Her mother is incensed by her daughter's budding relationship. She's determined to see her daughter become a successful actor and forces Vasantha to avoid Anand. He doesn't understand her sudden distance from him and is heartbroken. Vasantha eventually tells Anand about her past and why her mother is so determined to see her become a star. Anand reaffirms his love for Vasantha and the two decide to be together as they search for acting opportunities.  Figures from their past intervene and force the young couple to face more roadblocks in their quest for happiness.

Cast 

 Suresh as Anand
 Kalaranjini as Vasantha
 Nizhalgal Ravi as Gopi
 Thyagu as Suresh
 Major Sundarrajan as principal
 Pulavar Murugaiyyan
 Ennatha Kannaiya
 Kumarimuthu
 Thilakam Narayanasami

Soundtrack 
Soundtrack was composed by Ilaiyaraaja. The lyrics were written by Gangai Amaren, Muthulingam and Pulamaipithan.

Reception 
S. Shiva Kumar, writing for Mid-Day, panned the film, particularly for Kumar's direction, writing, and Suresh's performance.

References

External links 

1980s Tamil-language films
1982 films
Films scored by Ilaiyaraaja
Indian romantic drama films